Kurnatowszczyzna  is a village in the administrative district of Gmina Sidra, within Sokółka County, Podlaskie Voivodeship, in north-eastern Poland.

In the years 1975–1998, the town belonged administratively to the Białystok Province.

References

Kurnatowszczyzna